The 155th Ohio Infantry Regiment, sometimes 155th Regiment, Ohio Volunteer Infantry (OVI) was a Union Army infantry regiment in the Union Army during the American Civil War. It was among scores of regiments raised as Hundred Days Men to provide relief for veteran troops to enable a major U.S. War Department push to end the war within 100 days.

History
In early May 1864, the 92nd Regiment of the Ohio National Guard and the 44th Battalion (Mahoning County) were consolidated to form the 155th Regiment, Ohio Volunteer Infantry. The new unit was organized Sunday, May 8, at Camp Dennison (Cincinnati, Ohio) with 838 men under the command of Colonel Harley H. Sage for one hundred days' service. Sage had previously served in the 13th Ohio Infantry and 43rd Ohio Infantry, and had commanded the 92nd Regiment, Ohio National Guard before taking command of the 155th.

On May 12, the 155th OVI left for New Creek, West Virginia. The regiment did garrison duty at Martinsburg until June 3, when it moved to Washington, D.C. From there, it moved into Virginia to White House, Bermuda Hundred and then City Point. On June 29, it went into an entrenched camp at Norfolk, where it remained until July 27 as a part of the Army of the James. On that date, a Union expeditionary force (including the 155th Ohio, 20th New York Cavalry, 1st U.S. Volunteers, and two sections of the 8th New York Independent Battery) left Norfolk for Elizabeth City, North Carolina. The troops marched the forty miles or so south to Elizabeth City to capture horses, cotton, tobacco and other contraband. On August 6, 1864, the regiment returned to Natick. Fifteen days later, its term of enlistment expiring, the 155th was ordered home. The regiment returned to Ohio and was mustered out August 27, 1864. The 155th Ohio lost during its service 20 enlisted men by disease.

Service record
 May 8, 1864 - Mustered in at Camp Dennison
 May 12 - Departed Camp Dennison at 5:00 A.M.
 May 13 - At Parkersburg, West Virginia
 May 14 - At Cumberland, Maryland
 May 15 - Arrived at Martinsburg, West Virginia
 May 20 - Defenses of the Baltimore & Ohio Railroad
 May 25 - To Cedar Creek, Virginia, for escort duty
 May 26 - Back to Martinsburg, West Virginia
 June 3 - Ordered to Washington, D.C.
 June 9 - At White House, Virginia
 June 17 - Arrived at Bermuda Hundred, Virginia
 June 21 - At City Point, Virginia
 June 29 - Entrenched camp at Norfolk, Virginia
 July 27 - Expedition to Elizabeth City, North Carolina
 July 28 - Arrived at Elizabeth City, North Carolina
 August - Returned to Norfolk, Virginia
 August - Left for Ohio
 August 24 - Arrived at Camp Dennison, Ohio
 August 27 - Mustered out

Statistics
The men of the 155th varied greatly in age, with 52 men aged 40 and older. The oldest recruit was 48-year-old Private McAlister of Company A, and the youngest was 13-year-old William Barker, a musician with Company B. There was also 14-year-old Private Jimmy Ross of Company K.

Five companies of the 155th were from Pickaway County, Ohio—A, C, E, H, & I. Company H showed 83 men on the official roster; however two of the men never mustered, and another was discharged the day after muster on a Surgeon's Certificate of Disability. The remaining 80 active men of Company H ranged in age from a 15-year-old boy (the musician) to a 44-year-old sergeant. The average age of the company was 27, with 31 men aged 21 or younger, and six men aged 40 or over.

Field & staff
 Harley H. Sage, Colonel
 Roswell Shurtleff, Lt. Colonel
 Peter Lutz, Major
 R. G. McLean, Surgeon
 R. S. Stansbury, Surgeon
 Thomas J. Watkins, Adjutant
 Joseph Wallace, Regimental Quartermaster
 Samuel M. Bright, Chaplain
 Charles N. Dodd, Sergeant Major
 Archibald Armstrong, Quartermaster Sergeant
 Joseph B. Dunlap, Commissary Sergeant
 William R. Elder, Hospital Steward
 Charles B. Dowe, Principal Musician

Roll of Honor
 Clavin, Wilson T., Sergeant, Co. D - died July 13, 1864, at Norfolk, Virginia
 Howard, Cowden, Private, Co. G - died July 14, 1864, at Norfolk, Virginia
 Holiday, Lewis, Private, Co. E - died July 15, 1864, at Norfolk, Virginia
 Justice, G.A., Private, Co. F - died July 17, 1864
 McKinlay, William, Private, Co. E - died July 18, 1864, at Washington, D.C.
 Hunter, William, Private, Co. C - died July 19, 1864
 McCollum, Joel, Private, Co. D - died July 20, 1864, at Portsmouth, Virginia
 Warner, A.O., Private, Co. E - died July 21, 1864, at Portsmouth, Virginia
 Miller, James C., Private, Co. D - died July 31, 1864, at Portsmouth, Virginia
 Martz, Soloman, Private, Co. G - died August 1, 1864, at Portsmouth, Virginia
 Leopard, Manuel, Private, Co. D - died August 4, 1864, at Portsmouth, Virginia
 Baker, Lawrence, Private, Co. D - died August 5, 1864, at Portsmouth, Virginia
 Brothers, John W., 1st Sergt., Co. D - died August 13, 1864, at Portsmouth, Virginia
 Floor, Hiram, Private, Co. G - died August 14, 1864, at Portsmouth, Virginia
 McClain, John, Private, Co. H - died August 15, 1864, at Portsmouth, Virginia
 Shafer, David, Private, Co. G - died August 16, 1864, at Norfolk, Virginia
 Haggard, Thomas C., Private, Co. I - died August 21, 1864, at Portsmouth, Virginia
 Kennedy, Henderson G., Private, Co. D - died August 25, 1864, at Washington, D.C.
 Cunningham, Benj. C., Private, Co. B - died August 27, 1864
 Jacobs, Thomas, Private, Company B - died September 3, 1864, at Washington, D.C.

Notes

References
 Leeke, Jim (ed.), A Hundred Days to Richmond: Ohio's "Hundred Days" Men in the Civil War, Indiana University Press, 1999. .
 Longacre, Edward G., Army of Amateurs: General Benjamin F. Butler and the Army of the James, 1863–1865, Stackpole Books, 1997. .
 Robertson, William Glenn, Back Door to Richmond: The Bermuda Hundred Campaign, University of Delaware Press, 1987. .
Reid, Whitelaw, Ohio In The War: Her Statesmen, Her Generals, and Soldiers, Cincinnati: Moore, Wilstach & Baldwin, 1868. 
 Roster of Ohio Soldiers: War of the Rebellion, 1861–1866, Vol. IX, 141st–184th Regiment, Infantry, Ohio Roster Commission, Werner Co., 1886–95.

External links
155th Regiment, O.V.I. Website
Regimental Colors at The Ohio Historical Society
Larry Stevens' 155th OVI Page

Units and formations of the Union Army from Ohio
Cincinnati in the American Civil War
1864 establishments in Ohio
Military units and formations established in 1864
Military units and formations disestablished in 1864
1864 disestablishments in Ohio